Germantown is the name of three places in the U.S. state of New York:

 Germantown (town), New York, in Columbia County
 Germantown (CDP), New York, in Columbia County
 Germantown, in the town of Clarksville, Allegany County, New York
 Germantown, in the city of Port Jervis, New York

See also
 Germantown (disambiguation)